Jovan Smith (born January 25, 1983), better known by his stage name J. Stalin (also stylized as J Stalin or J-Stalin), is a rapper from the Cypress Village housing projects in West Oakland.  In 2007, he signed to Zoo Entertainment Production Company run by artist Mekanix, who described his style as a variant of Hyphy known as "Go".

Biography
J. Stalin was born into poverty and earned money as a child by selling candy bars on the BART trains. Around age 16, he began recording and selling rap music. As a youth he sold drugs in his local housing projects and spent eleven months on parole for drug dealing.

Musical career
Although young and boyish-looking, J-Stalin adopted a tough rapper persona.  He references Joseph Stalin in his stage name because they shared the same initials, and "...He was short like me, but he was always smashin' on everybody."  In a recent interview he remarked about his home and lifestyle, "This is West Oakland, man. This is the bottoms right here."  He went on to say that the crime rate in his neighborhood was so high, the city had remodeled the housing units in his housing project to remove the back doors so that criminals could not escape from home raids by the police.

J. Stalin's first widely released performances arose when a DJ Daryl, a local recording studio owner, placed him on a track he was recording.  A colleague of Daryl's, Richie Rich  was impressed enough to put J. Stalin on three tracks in his 2002 album Nixon Pryor Roundtree album and two more as a member of Rich's group, the Replacement Killers.  He later recorded and performed with artists such as G-Stack, Beeda Weeda, Keak Da Sneak and San Quinn, E-40, The Luniz, The Team, The Frontline, Mob Figaz, Yukmouth, Numskull, Shock G, and others. As of 2006 he had released roughly 7 mixtapes and had four releases scheduled for 2007.  Mekanix and Zoo Entertainment released "On Behalf of the Streets" on October 31, 2006.

Discography

Albums, mixtapes, collaborations, compilations
2006: J Stalin & The Mekanix - On Behalf Of The Streets
2008: Gas Nation
2009: J Stalin & Guce - Giants & Elephants
2010: Prenuptial Agreement
2012: Memoirs Of A Curb Server
2013: J Stalin & DJ.Fresh - Miracle & Nightmare On 10th Street (Deluxe Edition)
2021: Wired In 3
2021: Early Morning Shift 4
2021: Diesel Therapy 3
2021: On Behalf Of The Streets 3
2022: J Stalin & DJ.Fresh - The Real World 6

References

External links
J-Stalin Official MySpace page

Living people
Rappers from Oakland, California
1976 births
West Coast hip hop musicians
Gangsta rappers
21st-century American rappers
21st-century American male musicians